Hein Htet Aung (born 5 October 2001 ) is a Burmese professional footballer who plays as a winger for Selangor in Malaysia Super League. He is a graduate of Myanmar Football Academy. He was named player of the month for the 2020 Myanmar National League in September.

Club

Career

Myanmar Football Academy
Hein Htet Aung joined Myanmar Football Academy in 2011 at the age of 10. Tipped as a gem in the squad, Hein Htet Aung represented the national team throughout his spell at the academy annually. Starting from Under 12, he went all the way up to Under 22 where he is currently playing. Hein Htet Aung began his career as a forward but after some years, he switched to the wings where he can operate as both left and right winger. In 2018, he transferred to his hometown club Hanthawaddy United FC to begin his professional career.

Hanthawaddy United
Hein Htet Aung began his professional career at Hanthawaddy United in 2018 after graduating from Myanmar Football Academy Mandalay. Deemed to be the next rising star of the country, Hein Htet Aung settled in Hanthawaddy United not long after he arrived at the club. In his first season, he helped his team finish fourth in 2018 Myanmar National League as well as claiming a second place in 2018 General Aung San Shield. 2019 was a tough year for Hein Htet Aung as Hanthawaddy United finished fifth in 2019 Myanmar National League. However, after major changes were made within the club, including a managerial change, Hein Htet Aung once again showed his full potential in the following year. 2020 was a successful year for Hein Htet Aung as he helped Hanthawaddy United finish second in 2020 Myanmar National League, which was the biggest achievement in club's history. Despite being only 18 years old at the time, Hein Htet Aung scored 6 goals and laid on 9 assists which made him a join top assister with his national teammate Lwin Moe Aung. Not only that he won Player Of The Month award in September, he was named the best young player of 2020 Myanmar National League at the end of the season. After a successful 3 years spell at Hanthawaddy United, scoring a total of 9 goals over 62  appearances, Hein Htet Aung has decided to part ways with the team in order to achieve his dream of playing abroad. He is expected to join a Selangor-based team in Malaysia for 2021–22 season.

Selangor
In early 2021, Htet joins Selangor for the rest of the season. On 13 August, his agent confirmed he has sign a new contract before his amazing performance against Kedah Darul Aman that he managed got two assist in 4–2 win.

Controversies 
On March 6, 2021, after a match between Selangor II and PDRM FC, Hein displayed a three-finger salute showing solidarity for the ongoing Myanmar protests. As a result, on March 26, the Football Association of Malaysia (FAM) released a statement saying that Hein violated Article 59 of the FAM Disciplinary Code (2015 edition), and that he was given a one-match ban, not being allowed to participate in a match against Perak II on April 2.

International

Honours
 Hanthawaddy United
  Silver medal : 2018 General Aung San Shield
  Silver medal : 2020 Myanmar National League
  Gold medal : 2020 Myanmar National League Best Young Player of the Year

Myanmar U-22 National Football Team
 Bronze medal : 2019 BTV Cup

Individual
 Selangor
 Fan's Player Of The Year : 2022

References

External links
interview
Hein Htet Aung
profile

Living people
Burmese footballers
2001 births
People from Bago Region
Hanthawaddy United F.C. players
Association football forwards
Competitors at the 2021 Southeast Asian Games
Southeast Asian Games competitors for Myanmar